Mentalism is a performing art in which the practitioner simulates psychic abilities.

Mentalism may also refer to:
 Mentalism (philosophy), the belief that the mind truly exists
 Mentalism (psychology), those branches of study that concentrate on mental perception and thought processes
 Mentalism (discrimination), a form of discrimination against people labeled as having a mental disorder
 Oriental Mentalism, a spiritual doctrine expounded by Paul Brunton

See also 
 Mentalist (disambiguation)